Slania or Słania is a surname. Notable people with the surname include:

Czesław Słania (1921–2005), Polish postage stamp and banknote engraver
Dan Slania (born 1992), American baseball player